Hasse Ekman (born Hans Gösta Ekman; 10September 191515February 2004) was a Swedish director, actor, writer and producer for film, stage and television.

Biography 
Hasse Ekman is probably Sweden's most successful and critically acclaimed film director from the period after Sjöström and Stiller and prior to Ingmar Bergman, peaking between the mid-1940s and 1950. He was greatly influenced by filmmaker Orson Welles and also by episodic-films. His most successful film as a director is often said to be the 1950 film Flicka och hyacinter (Girl with Hyacinths), a crime/mystery drama about a young woman committing suicide by hanging herself in her apartment. His 1957 film Summer Place Wanted was entered into the 1st Moscow International Film Festival.

Hasse Ekman is part of the prominent "Ekman acting family" in Sweden: He was the son of Swedish star actor Gösta Ekman (senior) and father of actor Gösta Ekman (junior), actor Stefan Ekman and stage/film director Mikael Ekman. He is the grandfather of actress Sanna Ekman.

As an actor Ekman appeared in most of his own films, as the leading man and in a number of strong supporting roles, and he also acted in three early Ingmar Bergman films (Prison, Thirst and Sawdust and Tinsel). He also played opposite his famous father in Intermezzo, the original Swedish 1936 film starring Ingrid Bergman as the female lead. Overall he appeared in fifty Swedish films.

Selected filmography

Director 

1940: Med dej i mina armar
1941: Första divisionen
1942: Flames in the Dark
1942: Lyckan kommer
1943: Ombyte av tåg
1943: The Sixth Shot 
1944: Som folk är mest
1944: His Excellency
1945: Kungliga patrasket (The Royal Rabble)
1945: Vandring med månen (Wandering with the Moon)
1945: Fram för lilla Märta
1946: Meeting in the Night
1946: Interlude 
1946: Medan porten var stängd (While the Door Was Locked)
1947: One Swallow Does Not Make a Summer (En fluga gör ingen sommar)
1948: Each to His Own Way
1948: Lilla Märta kommer tillbaka (Little Martin Returns)
1948: Banketten (The Banquet)
1949: Flickan från tredje raden (The Girl from the Third Row)
1950: Flicka och hyacinter (Girl with Hyacinths)
1950: The White Cat
1950: Jack of Hearts 
1951: The Nuthouse
1952: The Firebird
1953: We Three Debutantes
1954: Gabrielle
1956: Ratataa
1956: Egen ingång
1956: Seventh Heaven
1957: Summer Place Wanted
1957: The Halo Is Slipping 
1958: The Jazz Boy
1958: The Great Amateur 
1959: Fröken Chic
1959: Heaven and Pancake
1960: On a Bench in a Park
1960: Kärlekens decimaler
1961: Rififi in Stockholm
1963: Min kära är en ros (My Love Is Like a Rose)
1964: Äktenskapsbrottaren
1965: Niklasons (TV Series)

screenwriting 
1938: Thunder and Lightning
1940: Swing it, magistern!
1940: A Real Man 
1940: Heroes in Yellow and Blue 
1941: Magistrarna på sommarlov
1941: The Ghost Reporter 
1943: Ombyte av tåg
1943: Men of the Navy 
1945: Fram för lilla Märta
1945: Kungliga patrasket (The Royal Rabble)
1946: Medan porten var stängd (While the Door Was Locked)
1948: Love Goes Up and Down
1948: Each to His Own Way
1948: Banketten ("The Banquet")
1949: Flickan från tredje raden (The Girl from the Third Row)
1950: Girl with Hyacinths
 1950:  The Kiss on the Cruise 
1953: Resan till dej
1956: Ratataa
1956: Egen ingång
1956: Seventh Heaven
1957: The Halo Is Slipping 
1958: You Are My Adventure
1958: The Jazz Boy
1959: Fröken Chic

Actor 

1924: Unga greven tar flickan och priset - Curious boy
1933: House Slaves - Kurt Rosenqvist
1933: En natt på Smygeholm - Leonard Barring
1936: Intermezzo - Åke Brandt
1937: John Ericsson - segraren vid Hampton Roads
1938: Thunder and Lightning - Bertil Bendix, Pontus sekreterare
1938: Med folket för fosterlandet - Hjalmar Karlsson
1939: Kadettkamrater - Bertil Winge
1940: Juninatten - Willy Wilson
1940: Med dej i mina armar - Svanberg's Secretary (voice, uncredited)
1941: Life Goes On - Ludvig
1941: Första divisionen - Fänrik Bråde
1942: Flames in the Dark - Per Sahlén, Student
1942: Lyckan kommer - Radioröst (voice, uncredited)
1943: Ombyte av tåg - Kim
1943: Life and Death - Kirre Granlund
1943: Sjätte skottet - Man med Marguerite på tågstationen (uncredited)
1944: En dag skall gry - Rutger von Brewitz
1944: I Am Fire and Air - Tore Ekström
1944: Stopp! Tänk på något annat - Karsten Kirsewetter
1945: Kungliga patrasket (The Royal Rabble) - Hans son
1945: Vandring med månen (Wandering with the Moon) - Ernst Törsleff
1945: Fram för lilla Märta - Kurre
1946: Interlude - Vilhelm Canitz
1946: Meeting in the Night - Åke
1946: While the Door Was Locked - Torsten v. Breda
1947: One Swallow Does Not Make a Summer - Bertil
1948: Each to His Own Way - Tage Sundell
1948: Lilla Märta kommer tillbaka - Fänriken
1948: Banketten (The Banquet) - Hugo
1949: Prison - Martin Grandé
1949: Flickan från tredje raden (The Girl from the Third Row) - Sture Anker
1949: Thirst - Dr. Rosengren
1950: Jack of Hearts - Anders Canitz
1951: The Nuthouse - Hans Hasseson Ekman / Fänrik Bråde / Kim (voice)
1953: We Three Debutantes - Narrator (voice, uncredited)
1953: Sawdust and Tinsel - Frans
1953: The Glass Mountain - Stellan Sylvester
1954: Dance in the Smoke - Gentleman in haystack (uncredited)
1954: The Yellow Squadron - Birger Wreting
1954: Gabrielle - Kjell Rodin
1956: Egen ingång - Sture Falk
1956: Seventh Heaven - Willy Lorens, radioprogramledare
1956: Ratataa - Klåd Tränger
1957: The Halo Is Slipping - Per-Axel Dahlander
1958: The Great Amateur - Max Wallby
1958: The Jazz Boy - Teddy Anker
1959: Fröken Chic - Buster Carell
1959: Heaven and Pancake - Villy Lorens
1960: Kärlekens decimaler - Karl Krister 'Charlie' Gedelius
1960: On a Bench in a Park - Stig Brender

Bibliography 
 Hur ska det gå med mej?, Hasse Ekman, Stockholm: Hökerberg, 1933.
 Gösta Ekman, Hasse Ekman, Stockholm: Bonnier, 1938.
 Den vackra ankungen, Hasse Ekman, Stockholm: Wahlström & Widstrand, 1955.
 Kurre Korint och drömfabriken: en djupt osannfärdig berättelse från filmens underbara värld, Hasse Ekman, Stockholm: Wahlström & Widstrand, 1956.

References

External links 
Ekmansocietys website 

1915 births
2004 deaths
Male actors from Stockholm
Swedish film directors
Swedish male film actors
Burials at Norra begravningsplatsen
20th-century Swedish male actors